Dolna Krushitsa is a village in Petrich Municipality, in Blagoevgrad Province, Bulgaria. As of 2013, it had a population of 177.

References

Villages in Blagoevgrad Province